The coat of arms of Dalmatia is the heraldic symbol used for the historical region of Dalmatia on the eastern coast of Adriatic Sea. It is also featured on the crest of the coat of arms of Croatia.

History

The arms first appeared in 14th century Gelre Armorial (pre-1396) representing Kingdom of Croatia and Dalmatia (Regnum Croatiae et Dalmatiae) as part of the coat of arms of King Louis I (1342-1382). Until 1526 these arms were used to represent Croatia in general as can be seen from coat of arms of several kings: Louis I, Mary, Matthias Corvinus and Louis II. It is also found on the great seals of Sigismund of Luxembourg, Albert II, John Zápolya, Ferdinand I, and from then on, on various seals and arms of the Habsburgs.

Historically there are two main variants of these arms:
The most widely used version is: azure, with three crowned golden leopards' heads affrontés caboshed Or, langued in gules (three golden lion heads, facing front, with golden crowns and red tongues, on a blue shield). This variant dates from at least the very late 14th century, found on the Great Seal of King Sigismund of Luxembourg (1395-1437). The Republic of Venice in its Great Arms (18th century) used a variant with the same charge, but on a gules (red) shield, with the tongues often gold rather than gules. Between 1815 and 1918, the crowned variant of this coat of arms, with the azure shield, was used by the Habsburg Kingdom of Dalmatia. And from 1868 until 1918 as part of the coat of arms of Kingdom of Croatia-Slavonia in the upper dexter quarter.
Another, earlier version, was: gules, with three lion heads argent, facing dexter, langued and crowned Or (meaning three white or silver lion heads, with golden crowns and tongues, turned to left, on a red shield). This variant dates from the mid-14th century as part of the arms of Louis I of Hungary (1342-1382). A variation of these arms (gules, with three lion heads Argent, facing dexter) representing Croatia appeared in the book called Beschreibung der Reise von Konstanz nach Jerusalem (1486).

Arms charge
From a strictly heraldic point of view the charges on the arms are not lions but heraldic leopards.  The heraldic leopard differs from the real-life leopard (Panthera pardus). It does not have any spots and often has a mane. Therefore, in heraldry, the leopard is generally similar, and is often referred to as a lion (Panthera leo). The reason for this lies in the fact that in the Middle Ages leopards were thought to be a crossbreed between a lion and a pard.

Gallery

See also 
 Flag of Dalmatia
 Dalmatia
 History of Dalmatia
 Kingdom of Dalmatia
 Coat of arms of Croatia
 Flags of Croatia

References 

Dalmatia
Dalmatia
Dalmatia
Dalmatia